Megan Kathleen Mischler (born August 8, 1989) is an American professional soccer player who last played for Washington Spirit of the National Women's Soccer League (NWSL). She played for Hammarby

References

External links
 

Living people
1989 births
Washington Spirit players
American women's soccer players
West Virginia Mountaineers women's soccer players
Women's Professional Soccer players
Women's association football forwards